Crisis on the Planet of the Apes VR is a 2018 action and virtual reality game. It was developed by Imaginati and published by FoxNext for PlayStation 4 and Microsoft Windows. It is based on the Planet of the Apes reboot film series, taking place between Rise of the Planet of the Apes and Dawn of the Planet of the Apes.

Gameplay
Crisis on the Planet of the Apes VR is a virtual reality action game played from a first-person perspective. The game is set five years after the film Rise of the Planet of the Apes, and prior to the events of Dawn of the Planet of the Apes. The Simian Flu has wiped out half of the human population and has resulted in an uprising of highly intelligent apes. The player takes on the role of an ape who has been imprisoned at a research facility by humans searching for a cure. The player's objective is to escape and rejoin Caesar's group of apes. Along the way, the player teams up with two other captured apes, Bone and Spear.

The game is played on a linear path, with the player performing ape-like movements to progress to predetermined spots in the environment. Human guards are encountered throughout the game and must be killed before proceeding. The player can use three types of guns, and can take cover during shootouts. The player can also climb pipes and swing from ceilings.

Development and release
Plans for a VR Planet of the Apes game were announced in January 2017. The game's title and plot were unveiled a year later. It was developed by Imaginati, which also created the 2017 game Planet of the Apes: Last Frontier. The game was developed using Unreal Engine. It was published by FoxNext, and was released on April 3, 2018, for Oculus headsets as well as the HTC Vive and PlayStation VR headsets.

Reception

Reviewers criticized the game's short length at roughly two hours. According to Gabe Gurwin of Inven Global, "Just as the game seemed to be reaching its climax and had begun ramping up the action with big set-pieces, the screen faded to black and the game was over". Matt Kamen of Empire stated that it "dabbles with interesting ideas and mechanics that could have expanded the range of play options" but which instead are "reduced to one-use scripted moments". He concluded that "with a bigger budget, longer run time, and a beefier story, Crisis could have done great things for VR". Jamie Feltham of UploadVR considered it a step forward for VR games, calling it "a surprisingly likable movie tie-in with several great ideas behind it. Its best ideas are underdeveloped but still manage to make a mark".

The inability to freely explore levels was criticized. Kamen opined that the game feels "like more of a guided VR experience than a full game in its own right". Jeuxvideo.com criticized the difficulty, as well as player tracking issues. Others found the gameplay sluggish and the controls awkward or frustrating. The game received some praise for its graphics and VR immersion.

Calum Marsh of IGN considered the game repetitive and felt that it lacked "the depth and seriousness" of the films. Gurwin stated that the game's events "feel entirely superfluous" to the films: "Remove it from the canon, and absolutely nothing has changed". He further commented that "you never get a chance to truly know your fellow apes, and it left me pining for a character on the level of Caesar or Koba". Ian Dean of PlayStation Official Magazine – UK called the game a "wonderful rabbit hole" for fans of the film series, but noted there are "no hidden secrets to uncover".

References

External links
 Crisis for the Planet of the Apes VR at MobyGames

2018 video games
Action video games
First-person video games
HTC Vive games
Oculus Rift games
Planet of the Apes
PlayStation VR games
Science fiction video games
Video games about primates
Video games based on films
Video games developed in the United Kingdom